Oscar Alberto Dertycia Álvarez (born 3 March 1965) is an Argentine retired footballer who played as a striker, who later worked as a manager.

Club career
Born in Córdoba, Córdoba Province, Dertycia started playing professionally with hometown club Instituto de Córdoba, moving in 1985 to Argentinos Juniors. During his four-year spell, he won the Copa Libertadores and finished runner-up in the Intercontinental Cup in his first season 1985, and was also crowned the Primera División's top scorer in 1988–89, finishing with 20 goals.

In the following summer, the player known as Tiburón ('the shark') due to his powerful playing style joined Italy's ACF Fiorentina, playing alongside the likes of Roberto Baggio and Dunga. After finding some form following a difficult start, a serious knee injury sustained in a clash with compatriot Diego Maradona in January 1990 ended his season early, while in his absence the team reached the final of the 1989–90 UEFA Cup. Only three foreign players were allowed to play in each match, and the club filled Dertycia's vacant slot with Marius Lăcătuș (a year later La Viola signed another Argentine with similar attributes, Gabriel Batistuta, to lead the attack to great effect).

With no prospect of another opportunity at Fiorentina, Dertycia moved on to Spain, first with Cádiz CF where he garnered a firm fanbase, being nicknamed Mister Proper due to the distinctive bald head he now sported (his body's reaction to the stress caused by the injury in Italy combined with the demands of a young family in a new country). However, his heyday would be at CD Tenerife: signed in 1991 as a replacement for Rommel Fernández, he was a useful offensive weapon for the Canary Islands side under compatriot Jorge Valdano and beside Diego Latorre and Fernando Redondo. Never an undisputed starter, he did amass 16 La Liga goals in his first two seasons combined, being intimately connected to the second of Tenerife's last-day defeats of Real Madrid in consecutive seasons which handed the championship to rivals FC Barcelona on both occasions.

Dertycia had one final season in the country – still in the top flight, where he went on to amass totals of 137 games and 39 goals – with Albacete Balompié, then returned to his native Córdoba to play in the Primera B Nacional. After short spells, including in Chile and Peru, he retired in 2002 at the age of 37. He later worked as a club coach and at a children's training academy in Córdoba.

International career
After appearing with the Argentine under-20 team at the 1983 FIFA World Youth Championship, scoring once to help his country reach the final, Dertycia received his first call-up for the full side in 1984, under Carlos Bilardo, and was a member of the 1987 Copa América squad that finished the tournament in fourth place. He was in contention for a place in the squad for the 1990 FIFA World Cup in Italy until being injured while playing in that country at club level.

Style of play
An aggressive and physically strong player, Dertycia was a powerful, quick and opportunistic centre-forward with an eye for goal, excellent positional sense and who excelled in the air. He was also a hard-working player who was adept at making attacking runs, and could play off of his team-mates as well as provide them with assists; these capabilities also enabled him to be deployed as a second striker throughout his career.

References

External links

1965 births
Living people
Footballers from Córdoba, Argentina
Argentine footballers
Association football forwards
Argentine Primera División players
Instituto footballers
Argentinos Juniors footballers
Club Atlético Belgrano footballers
Talleres de Córdoba footballers
General Paz Juniors footballers
Serie A players
ACF Fiorentina players
La Liga players
Cádiz CF players
CD Tenerife players
Albacete Balompié players
Deportes Temuco footballers
Argentina youth international footballers
Argentina under-20 international footballers
Argentina international footballers
1987 Copa América players
Argentine expatriate footballers
Expatriate footballers in Italy
Expatriate footballers in Spain
Expatriate footballers in Chile
Expatriate footballers in Peru
Argentine expatriate sportspeople in Spain
Argentine expatriate sportspeople in Peru
Argentine expatriate sportspeople in Italy
Argentine expatriate sportspeople in Chile
Association football coaches
People with alopecia universalis
Pan American Games bronze medalists for Argentina
Medalists at the 1987 Pan American Games
Footballers at the 1987 Pan American Games
Pan American Games medalists in football